The seventh season of the Sgt. Frog anime series consists of 51 episodes after episode 307 from the series, which first aired in Japan from April 3, 2010 to April 3, 2011 on TV Tokyo. The season had its running time reduced to 15 minutes in its original timeslot. However, a 2nd timeslot, which reruns the first 15-minute story and presents a new 15 minute one, called Keroro Gunso Otsu (ケロロ軍曹乙), was created. The "A" stories are the ones shown in the old timeslot, while the "B" stories are exclusive to the Otsu timeslot. After timeslot changes caused by the 2011 Tōhoku earthquake and tsunami, episode 356 was announced to be the final Keroro Gunso Otsu episode, with two stories exclusively airing in the night timeslot at a timeslot of 3:05 am, the announcement also referenced in the first airing of episode 355. However, after a few days that announcement was changed, and Keroro Otsu was just delayed for one week, returning to the original plans for the series' ending, although airing everything one week later.


Episode list

Notes

References

External links
  7th season episodes
  Keroro Gunsō schedule - Sunrise

2010 Japanese television seasons
2011 Japanese television seasons
Season 7